David Opatoshu (born David Opatovsky; January 30, 1918 – April 30, 1996) was an American actor. He is best known for his role in the film Exodus (1960).

Opatoshu began his acting career in the Yiddish theater.  Following his tenure in the role of 'Mr. Carp' in the 1938 national tour of the play Golden Boy, he made his Broadway debut in 1940 in the play Night Music. He then appeared in numerous television series and films. In 1991, he won a Primetime Emmy Award for his role in the episode "A Prayer for the Goldsteins" of the television series Gabriel's Fire.

Television
His career in television began in 1949 and lasted through the 1980s. In the fall of 1953, he played a theatrical agent representing Ezio Pinza's title character in the NBC situation comedy Bonino. Other costars were Mary Wickes, Chet Allen, and Van Dyke Parks. The series focused upon an Italian American opera singer trying to rear his six children after having been widowed.

 
In 1963 he co-starred with James Doohan in an episode of The Twilight Zone, titled "Valley of the Shadow". He guest-starred in the 1964 The Outer Limits episode "A Feasibility Study"; in the 1965 Voyage to the Bottom of the Sea episode "The Price of Doom'; and in the 1965 two-part episode of The Man from U.N.C.L.E. called "The Alexander the Greater Affair".  In 1967 he played Anan 7 in the original Star Trek series episode "A Taste of Armageddon". In 1969, he figured in a Hawaii Five-O episode "Face of the Dragon", and also in the 1969 season 3 Ironside episode "L'Chayim", and in Mannix, in the episode "A Pittance of Faith", as Mr. Lardelli, in the same year.

Opatoshu played in a 1970 episode of Daniel Boone as "Tamenund", an aged Pequot Indian bent on revenge for his tribe's near-extinction. He was also in the "No Way to Treat a Relative" episode of the 1973 situation comedy Needles and Pins (never broadcast because of the show's cancellation), the Kojak episode "Both Sides of the Law", the 1977 The Bionic Woman episode "Doomsday is Tomorrow", the 1978  Little House on the Prairie episode, I'll Be Waving as You Drive Away, the 1981 Buck Rogers in the 25th Century episode "Time of the Hawk", and the 1981 miniseries Masada. In 1986 he played an Iranian ambassador in the TV thriller Under Siege, about Islamic terrorist attacks in the United States.  On October 30, 1989, Opatashu guest-starred as the Tenctonese ex-slave "Paul Revere", in the episode "Night of the Screams", of the television series Alien Nation. In 1991 he won an Emmy Award for his guest appearance in the episode "A Prayer for the Goldsteins" of the ABC series Gabriel's Fire.

Films

His first film, The Light Ahead (1939), directed by Henry Felt and Edgar G. Ulmer, is notable for being entirely in Yiddish. Opatoshu appeared as the homicide detective, Sgt. Ben Miller, in the film noir, The Naked City (1948) produced by Mark Hellinger. In 1958, he played a supporting character in The Brothers Karamazov with his future Star Trek co-star William Shatner. He also portrayed Herr Jacobi, one of the people who help Paul Newman and Julie Andrews escape from East Germany in Alfred Hitchcock's 1966 film Torn Curtain. He also played the father of Benny Rampell in 1963's "The Cardinal" un credited.

He played the Irgun leader (and Ari Ben Canaan's estranged uncle) in Otto Preminger's 1960 film Exodus. In 1967, Opatoshu played Morris Kolowitz, the father of the main character David (Reni Santoni), in Carl Reiner's directorial debut Enter Laughing. In the 1977 film, Raid on Entebbe, he played the part of Menachem Begin, a film based on the actual Operation Entebbe and the freeing of hostages at Entebbe Airport in Entebbe, Uganda on July 4, 1976. He had played Begin's fictional counterpart in Exodus.

Stage
Opatoshu appeared on Broadway in Silk Stockings (1956), Once More, With Feeling (1958), The Wall (1960), Bravo Giovanni (1962), Lorenzo (1963), and Does a Tiger Wear a Necktie? (1969).

Screenwriter
David Opatoshu also wrote the screenplay for the film Romance of a Horsethief (1971), based on a novel by his father, Joseph Opatoshu.

Family
After serving with the Air Force in the South Pacific during World War II, Opatoshu returned to Manhattan and worked in radio, theater, television and films. His wartime experiences provided the material for "Between Sea and Sand," a collection of short stories he published in Yiddish in 1946. David Opatoshu was survived by his wife, Lillian Weinberg, a psychiatric social worker, whom he married on June 10, 1941. They had one child together, a son, Danny. Lillian died on May 13, 2000.

Complete filmography

The Light Ahead (1939) — Fishke
The Naked City (1948) — Sgt. Dave Miller (uncredited)
Illegal Entry (1949) — Al (uncredited)
Any Number Can Play (1949) — Bartender (uncredited)
Thieves' Highway (1949) — Frenchy — Thug in Cap (uncredited)
The Goldbergs (1950) — Mr. Dutton
The Most Wanted Man (1953) — Slim le Tueur
Crowded Paradise (1956)
The Brothers Karamazov (1958) — Capt. Snegiryov
Where Is Thy Brother? (1958, TV movie) — Father
Party Girl (1958) — Lou Forbes
Cimarron (1960) — Sol Levy
Exodus (1960) — Akiva Ben Canaan
Black City (1961) — Il commissario Natalucci
The Best of Enemies (1961) — Italian Physician Bernasconi
Guns of Darkness (1962) — President Rivera
The Cardinal (1963) — Mr. Rampell (uncredited)
Sands of Beersheba (1963) — Daoud
One Spy Too Many (1966) — Mr. Kavon
Tarzan and the Valley of Gold (1966) — Augustus Vinero
Torn Curtain (1966) — Mr. Jacobi
The Defector (1966) — Orlovsky
Enter Laughing (1967) — Mr. Morris Kolowitz
Ha-Dybbuk (1968) — Zadik
The Fixer (1968) — Latke
The Smugglers (1968, TV movie) — Alfredo Faggio
Death of a Gunfighter (1969) — Edward Rosenbloom
The D.A.: Murder One (1969, TV movie) — Dr. Rudolph Grainger
A Walk in the Spring Rain (1970) — (uncredited)
Incident in San Francisco (1971, TV movie) — Herschel Roman
Romance of a Horsethief (1971) — Schloime Kradnik
Portrait: A Man Whose Name Was John (1973, TV movie) — Rabbi Isaac Herzog
Conspiracy of Terror (1975, TV movie) — Arthur Horowitz
Francis Gary Powers: The True Story of the U-2 Spy Incident (1976, TV movie) — Grinev
Raid on Entebbe (1976, TV movie) — Menachem Begin
Woman on the Run (1977, TV movie) — Ed Mills
Ziegfeld: The Man and His Women (1978, TV movie) — Flo's Father
Who'll Stop the Rain (1978) — Bender
In Search of Historic Jesus (1979, Documentary) — Herod
Americathon (1979) — Abdul Muhammad
Beyond Evil (1980) — Dr. Solomon
Flash Gordon: The Greatest Adventure of All (1982, TV movie) — Vultan (voice)
Forced Vengeance (1982) — Sam Paschal
Forty Days of Musa Dagh (1982) — Henry Morgenthau, Sr.
Under Siege (1986, TV movie) — Ambassador Sajid Moktasanni
Conspiracy: The Trial of the Chicago 8 (1987, TV movie) — Judge Julius Hoffman

Partial television credits

The Walter Winchell File (1958) — Triple "A" — episode "The Silent City"
The Outer Limits (1964) — Ralph Cashman — episode "A Feasibility Study"
Dr. Kildare (1965) — Fred Kirsh (six episodes)
Perry Mason (1965) — episode "The Case of the Feather Cloak"
The Time Tunnel (1966) — episode "Reign Of Terror"
The Streets of San Francisco (1972) — episode "The Thirty-Year Pin"
Masada (1981 miniseries) — Shimon
Alfred Hitchcock Presents (1964) — episode "The Magic Shop"
Buck Rogers in the 25th Century (1981) — episode "Time of the Hawk"
Little House on the Prairie (1978) — episode "I'll Be Waving as You Drive Away: Part 2" 

Mission Impossible (1967) – Deputy Premiere Anton Kudnov – episode 18 "The Trial"

References

External links

 
 
 
 
 

1918 births
1996 deaths
American Ashkenazi Jews
Male actors from New York City
American male film actors
American male screenwriters
American male stage actors
American male television actors
American people of Russian-Jewish descent
American people of Polish-Jewish descent
Emmy Award winners
Male actors from Los Angeles
20th-century American male actors
Jewish American male actors
Screenwriters from New York (state)
Screenwriters from California
20th-century American male writers
20th-century American screenwriters
20th-century American Jews